The New Zealand Taxpayers' Union is a self-described taxpayer pressure group founded in 2013 to scrutinise government spending, publicise government waste, and promote an efficient tax system. It claims to be politically independent and not aligned to, or intended to develop into, a political party. The group refuses to state who funds them and generally refuses requests to speak with media about this. In 2019, it was reported the group has been funded in part by British American Tobacco. This, along with their close ties to many right-wing figures from the New Zealand political scene, has resulted in them being widely regarded as a right-wing pressure group.

Personnel
The group was first chaired for four years by John Bishop, a former Television New Zealand political editor, and father of National Party list MP Chris Bishop. He was succeeded by Barrie Saunders, who held the chair for three years from 2017 to 2021. Ashley Church, a director of the Israel Institute of New Zealand and a former CEO of the Property Institute of New Zealand, was invited onto the Board in 2020 and became its chairperson in 2021, but stepped down after five months.

The group's co-founder and Executive Director is Wellington lawyer Jordan Williams. Williams is known for fronting the 'Vote for Change' campaign during the 2011 referendum on New Zealand's voting system. Williams previously worked at the law firm of former ACT MP Stephen Franks. Williams was involved in a series of lawsuits over defamation with the then leader of the Conservative Party of New Zealand Colin Craig. In 2019 Williams apologised to Craig for defamation and Williams dropped his counter-suit. 

David Farrar co-founded the group and sits on its board of directors. Farrar continued to be heavily involved in the Fifth National Government's campaign activities, as its pollster and was described by Prime Minister John Key as "the best pollster in New Zealand" during his victory speech on election night 2011. Farrar describes himself as "very pro economic liberalism", and has stated that the Taxpayers' Union is not "anti left or right" and "I suspect we will somewhat annoy whoever is in government at the time".

Activities
The Taxpayers' Union initiatives include public relations campaigns and paid advertising. Campaigns are intended to generate media interest and greater public involvement and support for fiscally conservative causes.

Its major campaigns have included reports on corporate welfare by the John Key-led government, commissioning independent costings of the election promises of all the major political parties during the 2014 election, and league tables comparing the performance of local government organisations.

In January 2014, the group released internal ACC documents suggesting that $19 million awarded to the New Zealand Council of Trade Unions and Business New Zealand had been wasted. Soon afterward the scheme was scrapped.

In June 2014 the group partnered with Fairfax Media to produce local government league tables, labeled "The Ratepayers' Report".

The group operates a confidential 'tip line' for members of the public and government officials to report examples of government waste.

The Taxypayers' Union shares a close relationship with the New Zealand Free Speech Union. Jordan Williams founded the FSU's predecessor, and both the Taxpayers' Union and FSU's offices are located next to each other.

Controversies

Use of false identities

In October 2018, The New Zealand Herald revealed the results of an investigation into the Taxpayers' Union, showing that staff members acting on behalf of the organisation (and in an organised campaign) assumed false identities to lodge Official Information Act  requests with the New Zealand Government's science research agency. After refusing to comment for two days, representatives from the Union admitted they had used false identities in this way. The Herald investigation found that all of the email accounts used for the requests were linked to one particular email address of a Taxpayers' Union staff member by way of account recovery processes.

The Union claimed the reason for the use of the email accounts was to successfully obtain information from the science agency, which they said "de-prioritised" requests from them, and defended its actions as justified and in the public interest. However, in the interview with Guyon Espiner where Union head Jordan Williams made that claim, and also claimed that the information came from "within Callaghan Innovation", he provided no supporting evidence for either claim. During the response segment of the same interview, Chair of Callaghan Innovation Pete Hodgson pointed out that in the year ending June 2018 Callaghan Innovation received 26 requests they knew to be from the Union, and 14 they suspected were from the Union but that did not use the Union's name. All of these were responded to within the legal time limits. Hodgson pointed out that Callaghan met these legal time limits 94% of the time for general requests in the same year, so the Union received slightly better service than New Zealand as a whole. 

In response to a direct question from Espiner about whether Callaghan had ever stalled the Taxpayer's Union on a request they had made, Hodgson responded "No the opposite, we met the request on every occasion at some considerable expense. Our running cost for this...is just over $103,000. There has been a huge effort by Callaghan to respond to this blizzard of requests and it's all been done within the legal time."

Promotion of the use of nicotine products

The Union has regularly opposed tobacco control measures and launched a campaign called "Clear The Air" to promote the use of e-cigarettes. They have been accused of "echoing tobacco industry arguments", and their financial connections to British American Tobacco are well documented.

References

External links

Conservatism in New Zealand
Taxpayer groups
Lobbying organisations in New Zealand
2013 establishments in New Zealand